Good faith is a sincere intention to be fair, open and honest.

Good faith may also refer to:

 Good faith (law), implied covenant of honesty and fair dealing in contract law
 Good Faith (Rik Emmett album) (2003), eighth studio album by Canadian guitarist Rik Emmett
 Good Faith (Madeon album), a 2019 album by French DJ and producer Madeon

See also
 Bona fide (disambiguation)
 Good Faith Collaboration
 Good faith estimate
 Good-faith exception
 Good-faith provisions